The 1947 Wyoming Cowboys football team represented the University of Wyoming in the Mountain States Conference (MSC) during the 1947 college football season.  In their first season under head coach Bowden Wyatt, the Cowboys compiled a 4–5 record (2–4 against MSC opponents), finished sixth in the MSC, and outscored all opponents by a total of 175 to 168.

The 1947 season was Bowden Wyatt's first as a head coach. He was posthumously inducted into the College Football Hall of Fame as a coach in 1997.

Schedule

References

Wyoming
Wyoming Cowboys football seasons
Wyoming Cowboys football